An  is an impression of the  (face make-up) of kabuki actors on a piece of cloth, usually silk or cotton, created as an artwork and memento.

 are customarily made after the performance of a kabuki play, though not necessarily after every performance, and given as highly valued souvenirs of the event. A single  may have face-impressions from one or several actors, usually all from the same show, illustrating the make-up designs for major characters in the play. It may also include autographs, dates and additional inscriptions; sometimes other graphic elements are added to the design.

The same term can also be used to describe an artistic depiction of kabuki make-up created by other means, but intended to emulate the appearance of a face-print.

See also
, the white foundation used by kabuki actors
Clown Egg Register

External links
"Anatomy of an Oshiguma 押隈の 解剖学です". via Scribd.com
"Kabuki Oshiguma Redux agostinoarts". Christopher Agostino. February 21, 2012.
"Kabuki actors oshiguma face pressing - Contributed by trevorormandi". BBC History of the World.
"Kumadori". Immortalgeisha.com. May 18, 2011.

Kabuki
Japanese art